The Hospital for Tropical Diseases is a hospital in Ratchathewi District, Bangkok. It is a public hospital operated by the Faculty of Tropical Medicine, Mahidol University. It specialises in tropical medicine and, since 2012, travel medicine.

History 
The Hospital for Tropical Diseases was opened on 23 February 1961 by Prof. Chamlong Harinasuta, M.D. and Prof. Khunying Tranakchit Harinasuta, M.D, founders of the Faculty of Tropical Medicine. The first building was a three-storey building which had only 20 beds and received only in-patients, usually transferred from Siriraj Hospital, or from other hospitals. After an increase in patient demand, the hospital was expanded to a five-storey building which was completed and opened in November 1964. In 1967, there were 100 beds and today, the hospital has up to 250 beds. In 2000-2001, the hospital opened a Thai traditional medicine clinic and a Chinese traditional medicine clinic. In 2005, a travel clinic was opened and in 2012, a fever clinic. In 2013, the new  'Rajanagarindra' Building was opened by Princess Maha Chakri Sirindhorn and a "Trop Med Home Care" service was introduced to provide health care services for the elderly at home.

See also 
 Health in Thailand
 Healthcare in Thailand
 Hospitals in Thailand
 Mahidol University

References 

 This article incorporates material from the corresponding article in the Thai Wikipedia.

External links 
 

Hospitals in Thailand
Mahidol University
Ratchathewi district